Blastocladia angusta is a species of fungus.

External links
 Mycobank entry

Fungi described in 1834
Blastocladiomycota